Koutsopoulos is a Greek surname.  People with this name include:

Dimitrios Koutsopoulos (born 1978), Greek footballer
Dušan Jelic Koutsopoulos (born 1974), Serbian-Greek former basketball player
Vangelis Koutsopoulos (born 1980), Greek footballer

Surnames
Greek-language surnames